Edgar Edwin Henke (December 13, 1927 – June 28, 2015) was an American football offensive and defensive lineman in the National Football League for the San Francisco 49ers and St. Louis Cardinals.  He also played in the All-America Football Conference for the Los Angeles Dons.  Henke played college football at the University of Southern California and was drafted in the thirteenth round of the 1949 NFL Draft by the Washington Redskins. Henke also played three season in the Western Interprovincial Football Union with the Calgary Stampeders and the Winnipeg Blue Bombers, being named an All Star in 1950 and 1954.

References

1927 births
2015 deaths
American football defensive ends
Calgary Stampeders players
Los Angeles Dons players
San Francisco 49ers players
Sportspeople from San Bernardino County, California
St. Louis Cardinals (football) players
USC Trojans football players
Winnipeg Blue Bombers players
Western Conference Pro Bowl players
People from Ontario, California
Players of American football from California